Christopher Anthony Seagraves (born 7 October 1964) is an English former professional footballer who played as a full-back.

References

1964 births
Living people
Footballers from Liverpool
English footballers
Association football fullbacks
Liverpool F.C. players
Grimsby Town F.C. players
Wealdstone F.C. players
English Football League players